Pio Tuwai is a Fiji rugby union player. He is currently playing for the Fiji sevens team. Tuwai is well known for his offloading abilities, this makes him one of the most exciting players to watch in the World Rugby Sevens Series.

Tuwai played for the Sri Lankan Army in 2014. He returned to the Fiji sevens team in 2015 and played at the Hong Kong Sevens.

References

External links
 Zimbio Bio

Fiji international rugby sevens players
Living people
Fijian rugby union players
1983 births
People from Yasawa